Kévin Renato Fortes Oliveira (born 8 June 1996) is a Cape Verdean professional footballer who plays as a midfielder for Doxa Katokopias

Club career

Swope Park Rangers
Oliveira signed for USL club the Swope Park Rangers on February 3, 2016. He scored his first goal for the side in its first-ever game on March 26, 2016 against Portland Timbers 2. Oliveira had three goals and four assists before suffering a torn ACL in his left knee in training in late June 2016, which ended his season.

Sporting Kansas City
On 15 September 2017, Oliveira signed with Major League Soccer side Sporting Kansas City, the parent club of Swope Park Rangers.

On 10 December 2017, Oliveira was traded by Sporting Kansas City along with Tyler Pasher and a second-round pick in the 2018 MLS SuperDraft to Atlanta United FC in exchange for Kenwyne Jones, Alexander Tambakis, and a fourth-round pick in the 2021 MLS SuperDraft.

Ottawa Fury
On 18 January 2018, Oliveira signed with USL side Ottawa Fury FC.

International career
Oliveira made his debut for the Cape Verde national team in a 2018 World Cup qualifier loss to Senegal in October 2017.

References

External links
 
 
 

1996 births
Living people
People from São Vicente, Cape Verde
Portuguese expatriate footballers
Portuguese footballers
Association football midfielders
Cape Verdean footballers
S.L. Benfica B players
S.C. Covilhã players
Liga Portugal 2 players
Sporting Kansas City II players
Sporting Kansas City players
Ottawa Fury FC players
Doxa Katokopias FC players
USL Championship players
Major League Soccer players
Cape Verde international footballers
Expatriate soccer players in the United States
Expatriate soccer players in Canada
Expatriate footballers in Cyprus
Cape Verdean expatriate sportspeople in the United States
Portuguese expatriate sportspeople in the United States
Cape Verdean expatriate sportspeople in Canada
Portuguese expatriate sportspeople in Canada
Cape Verdean expatriate sportspeople in Cyprus
Portuguese expatriate sportspeople in Cyprus